Acacia Technologies may refer to

 A division of Acacia Research
 A division within Computer Associates that effectively closed down in 2002 when its assets were sold to SSA Global Technologies